The Tachikawa T.S 1 was a light trainer prototype built in Japan.

Design and development
The low-cost all wood construction aircraft was unique in having a complex retractable landing gear.

The aircraft was not put into production due to a limited market and high cost to manufacture.

Specifications (Tachikawa T.S. 1)

References

1930s Japanese military trainer aircraft
T.S.1